Peter Emslie (born 21 October 1968) is a South African former cricketer. He played in 36 first-class and 34 List A matches for Border from 1993/94 to 1998/99.

See also
 List of Border representative cricketers

References

External links
 

1968 births
Living people
South African cricketers
Border cricketers
People from Makhanda, Eastern Cape
Cricketers from the Eastern Cape